Miné de Klerk (born 30 March 2003) is a South African athlete who specializes in the shot put and discus throw. She was the double medallist at both the 2021 and 2022 World Athletics Under-20 Championships. De Klerk won gold in shot put on both occasions and added medals for discus throw, taking silver in 2021 and bronze in 2022.

References

External links

2003 births
Living people
South African female shot putters
South African female discus throwers
World Athletics U20 Championships winners
21st-century South African women